The Walton–Wiggins Farm is a historic farmhouse in Springfield, Tennessee, U.S..

The house was built circa 1855 for Dr. Lycurgus B. Walton, a physician and slaveholder. His son, Martin Atkinson Walton, graduated from the Vanderbilt University School of Medicine and took over his father's medical practise in the house. He lived there with his wife, Elizabeth Henry Woodard, and their six children. One of his daughter, Eva, married John Bynum Wiggins, and the farm was subsequently inherited by their descendants. By the 1980s, the owner was John Bynum Wiggins III, and the farm was used for "livestock cattle, soybeans, tobacco, corn and wheat."

The house was designed in the Colonial Revival architectural style, with Greek Revival features. It has been listed on the National Register of Historic Places since August 8, 1997.

References

Houses on the National Register of Historic Places in Tennessee
Colonial Revival architecture in Tennessee
Houses completed in 1855
National Register of Historic Places in Robertson County, Tennessee